The Prince is a 2005 American novel by Francine Rivers. It is the third novel in the Sons of Encouragement series, and tells the tale of the  biblical character of Jonathan, the son of Saul the King in the Old Testament.

Plot introduction
Jonathan. His zeal carried him into battle. His faithfulness won him honor among his people. His humility led him into friendship with the man who would become king in his place. David was a man after God's own heart. But it was the courage and selflessness of his best friend that opened the door to David's rule. A man of honor and deep faith.

2005 American novels
Novels by Francine Rivers
Novels set in ancient Israel
Novels based on the Bible